Kabamba is a location in Mubende District, Central Uganda.

Location
The coordinates of Kabamba are:0°15'00.0"N, 31°11'06.0"E (Latitude:0.2500; Longitude:31.1850).

History
By 1981, Kabamba housed a military base, known as the "Kabamba Military Barracks" or "Kabamba Training School". This location housed "several companies" belonging to the Tanzania People's Defence Force (TPDF) whose members were training soldiers of Uganda's then-national military, the Uganda National Liberation Army. In addition, the base hosted a large armoury.

In an attempt to capture the weapons of the armoury, the Popular Resistance Army (PRA) rebel group under Yoweri Museveni launched a raid on the Kabamba Military Barracks on 6 February 1981 during the early stages of the Ugandan Bush War. The attack failed, although the PRA retreated in good order. The PRA later merged with other rebels, forming the National Resistance Army (NRA) which captured Kabamba later into the Bush War.

Population
At this time the human population of Kabamba is not publicly known.

Points of interest
The following points of interest lie in or near Kabamba:
 Kalama Armoured Warfare Training School (KAWATS) - Located at Kabamba, Mubende District
 River Katonga lies immediately south of Kabamba
 Villa Road runs through Kabamba, in a north to south direction. The road connects the Mubende-Kyegegwa Road to the north, with Villa Maria, a suburb of Masaka to the south.
 Uganda Military Academy - Located at Kabamba, Mubende District.

See also
 List of military schools in Uganda
 Military of Uganda
 Uganda People's Defense Force

References

Works cited

External links
 Location of Kabamba At Google Maps

Populated places in Central Region, Uganda
Cities in the Great Rift Valley
Mubende District